The Orkney Manifesto Group (OMG) was a minor political party in Orkney, Scotland. The group advocated for politicisation of Orkney Islands Council, believing that party-based representation would offer more robust democratic governance than the current council of elected independents. The OMG started as an alliance of three Independents who campaigned on a joint manifesto for the 2012 election, before finally registering as a party in 2013.

The party won two seats at the 2017 Orkney Islands Council election.

The party de-registered with the Electoral Commission on 29 March 2022, and as a result has fielded no candidates in the 2022 Orkney election. Rachael King is the only OMG councillor to seek re-election, as an independent candidate.

Election results

West Mainland by-election
In its first electoral test as a registered party, Rachael King was elected in a by-election for the West Mainland ward following the death of the incumbent councillor Alistair Gordon (first elected as an Independent, he had helped set up the OMG). Having won a majority of first preference votes, she was elected in the first round.

Orkney Islands Council election

References

Political parties established in 2013
2013 establishments in Scotland
Locally based political parties in Scotland